The O'Boylan (Irish: Ó Baoigheallain) or O'Boyland sept came from Airgíalla, having their principal stronghold in the barony of Dartrey in County Monaghan. They soon spread to reach eastern County Fermanagh, across County Monaghan and southern County Armagh, and into the northern part of County Louth. They also established themselves to the south of their original territory, in County Cavan and County Meath. The name is still found most frequently in those areas, but invariably with the prefix O.

From the 8th century, the O'Boylan (Ó Baoigheallain) sept are cited as early kings of Dartraighe in present day County Monaghan. The territory of the Ó Baoigheallain during early medieval times stretched from Fermanagh to Louth before being reduced to the region of Dartry by the MacMahons after the Norman invasion. They did, however, remain powerful, and in O'Dugan's fourteenth-century "Topographical Poem" they are called "the bold kings of Dartry," and are praised for their horsemanship.

Surnames